Dag Skogheim (17 May 1928 – 4 December 2015) was a Norwegian teacher, poet, novelist, short story writer, biographer and non-fiction writer.

Biography
He was born in Sømna and grew up in Brønnøysund. His parents were Halvdan Marius Pettersen Skogheim (1901–1974) and Edel Markussen (1906–1993). He attended the Elverum Teacher School  and later Trondheim Teachers College prior to attending  the University of Oslo. Between 1961 and 1972 he worked as a teacher in Ålesund, Rendalen and Asker.

He made his literary debut in 1970 with the poetry collection ... gagns menneske. From 1972 he worked as a full-time writer. His literary breakthrough came in 1980, with the documentary novel Sulis, the first of a four-volume chronicle about migrant railway construction workers in Northern Norway. He received the Nordland county's cultural award in 1991, and in the same year he received a lifelong government scholarship. Sanatorieliv from 2001 is a treatment of medical, social and cultural aspects of tuberculosis, partly based upon his own childhood experiences, when he spent eleven years in various sanatoriums. The book was awarded the Sverre Steen Prize from the Norwegian Historical Association in 2002.

He was also a long-time columnist for Klassekampen. He died in December 2015.

References

1928 births
2015 deaths
People from Sømna
People from Brønnøy
20th-century Norwegian poets
Norwegian male poets
20th-century Norwegian novelists
21st-century Norwegian novelists
Norwegian non-fiction writers
Norwegian male novelists
Norwegian columnists
Norwegian government scholars
20th-century Norwegian male writers
21st-century Norwegian male writers
University of Oslo alumni
Male non-fiction writers